Mohammad Ali (also romanized as Moḩammad ‘Alī) is a village in Tashan-e Sharqi Rural District, Tashan District, Behbahan County, Khuzestan Province, Iran. At the 2006 census, its population was 208, with 32 families.

References 

Populated places in Behbahan County